Oenoe hybromella is a species of clothes moth in the family Tineidae.

The MONA or Hodges number for Oenoe hybromella is 0283.

References

Further reading

External links

 

Tineidae
Moths described in 1874